Farsho is a village in the district of Bharatpur, Rajasthan in western India. It primarily has an agricultural economy and its residents are Hindu. Firmly focused on education for its children, 100% of school-aged children attend school and it has a 66% literacy rate.

Geography
It is located on the bank of the Vand Ganga River and is 2 km from the town of Virampura, 11 km from Ucchain, and 12 km from Bayana Tehseal.

Government
This village is a Gram Panchayat, which includes Nagla Navariya, Honta Kaa Nagla, Kurvariya and Farsho. Sarpanch of the village is Puran Singh Foujdar. The village is a capital kingdom of Jat Maharajah.

Demographics
All of its citizens are Hindu.  As of 2001 India census, Farsho had a population of 4,560. Males constitute 54% of the population and females 46%. Bharatpur has an average literacy rate of 66%, higher than the national average of 59.5%; with male literacy of 75% and female literacy of 56%. 15% of the population is under 6 years of age.

Political view
The village Farsho are very sensitive in terms of political point of view. The village Farsho is a fort of BJP's by excepting jatav which is 10% of bsp.

Economy  
This village economy is mostly dependent upon agriculture, but there are also supporting businesses like milk collection services, contractors, marketing and trade promoters, and educators.

Education
Of the current school aged children in the village, 100% are educated. Of the previous generation, 78% were educated.

References

Cities and towns in Bharatpur district